Mammata Bhatta (मम्मट भट्ट) was a Kashmiri Sanskrit rhetorician noted for his text on poetics, the kâvya-prakâsha (light on poetics).

Published works 
Poetry in ‘The Bloomsbury Book of Great Indian Love Poems'

References 

Year of birth missing
Year of death missing
11th-century Indian scholars
Indian Sanskrit scholars
Indian rhetoricians
Kashmiri writers